Vincent Trocheck (born July 11, 1993) is an American professional ice hockey center for the New York Rangers of the National Hockey League (NHL). He was selected by the Florida Panthers in the third round, 64th overall, of the 2011 NHL Entry Draft.

Playing career

Early life
Trocheck was born in Pittsburgh, Pennsylvania, and grew up playing minor ice hockey for the Pittsburgh Hornets until he was 13 years old before he moved with his family to Detroit, Michigan. He played in the 2006 Quebec International Pee-Wee Hockey Tournament with the Pittsburgh Hornets.

Junior
He then played for the Detroit Little Caesars during which he was the two-time national champion and two time league leading scorer playing in the MWEHL. In his major junior career, Trocheck joined the Saginaw Spirit of the Ontario Hockey League (OHL) after he was a 24th overall pick in the 2009 OHL Priority Draft. In his second season with the Spirit in 2010–11, he was selected to the CHL Top Prospects Game.

Trocheck was selected in the third round, 64th overall in the 2011 NHL Entry Draft. On April 23, 2012, Trocheck was signed to a three-year, entry-level contract with the Florida Panthers.

Trocheck was rewarded for his outstanding play during the 2012–13 season with Saginaw and the Plymouth Whalers by being named to the OHL's First All-Star Team.

Professional

Florida Panthers
Trocheck spent parts of the 2013–14 and 2014–15 season with the Panthers AHL affiliate, the San Antonio Rampage.

Trocheck scored his first NHL goal against the New Jersey Devils on March 14, 2014. On July 3, 2016, as a restricted free agent, Trocheck signed a six-year, $28.5 million contract with the Panthers.

During the 2017–18 season, in the midst of a career season with the Panthers, on January 10, 2017, Trocheck was named to the 2017 NHL All-Star Game roster where he also participated in the All-Star Skills Competition. He finished the season registering a career high 31 goals and 44 assists for 75 points in 82 games.

Carolina Hurricanes
In the 2019–20 season, while in his seventh season with the Panthers having collected 10 goals and 36 points in 55 games, Trocheck was dealt by Florida at the NHL trade deadline to the Carolina Hurricanes in exchange for Erik Haula, Lucas Wallmark, Eetu Luostarinen and Chase Priskie on February 24, 2020.

New York Rangers
Having left the Hurricanes as a free agent following the  season, Trocheck was signed on the opening day of free agency, agreeing to a seven-year, $39.375 million contract with the New York Rangers on July 13, 2022.

International play

He played for the United States, which captured the gold medal in the 2013 World Junior Championships.  Trocheck played in 7 games recording 3 goals and 3 assists for 6 total points, including an empty net goal and an assist in the gold medal game.

On September 2, 2016, it was announced that Trocheck would compete for Team North America in the 2016 World Cup of Hockey. He scored 1 goal in 3 games for a total of 1 point in the tournament.

Personal life
Trocheck signed a multi-year agreement with equipment manufacturer STX in October 2015. Terms were undisclosed.

Trocheck is currently married to Hillary Trocheck. They have two children, Lennon and Leo.

Career statistics

Regular season and playoffs

International

Awards and honors

References

External links 

1993 births
Living people
American men's ice hockey centers
Carolina Hurricanes players
Florida Panthers draft picks
Florida Panthers players
National Hockey League All-Stars
New York Rangers players
Ice hockey people from Pittsburgh
Plymouth Whalers players
Saginaw Spirit players
San Antonio Rampage players